Mandvi is one of the 182 Legislative Assembly constituencies of Gujarat state in India. It is part of Kachchh district and is a segment of Kachchh Lok Sabha constituency. It is numbered as 2-Mandvi.

List of segments
This assembly seat represents the following talukas. This assembly seat represents the following segments:

 Mandvi Taluka
 Mundra Taluka

Members of Legislative Assembly

Election results

2022

2017

2012

2007

2002

1998

1995

1990

1985

1980

1975

1972

1967

1962

References

External links
 

Assembly constituencies of Gujarat
Politics of Kutch district